Fort Casey State Park is located on Whidbey Island, in Island County, Washington state. It is a Washington state park and a historic district within the U.S. Ebey's Landing National Historical Reserve.

Admiralty Inlet was considered so strategic to the defense of Puget Sound in the 1890s that three forts—Fort Casey on Whidbey Island, Fort Flagler on Marrowstone Island, and Fort Worden at Port Townsend—were built with the intention to create a "triangle of fire" against invading ships. This military strategy was based on the theory that the three fortresses would thwart any invasion attempt by sea.

History

Fort Casey was named for Brigadier General Thomas Lincoln Casey, U.S. Army Chief of Engineers. Designed as part of the massive modernization program of U.S. seacoast fortifications initiated by the Endicott Board, construction on Fort Casey began in 1897. In 1901, the big guns on disappearing carriages, which could be raised out of their protective emplacements so that the guns were exposed only long enough to fire, became active. However, the fort's batteries became obsolete almost as soon as their construction was completed.

The invention of the airplane in 1903, and the subsequent development of military aircraft made the fort vulnerable to air attack.  In addition, the development of battleships designed with increasingly accurate weaponry transformed the static strategies of the nineteenth century into the more mobile attack systems of the twentieth century.

Most of Fort Casey's guns and mortars were removed during World War I, when they were mounted on railcars to serve as mobile heavy artillery. Some of these weapons were returned to the fort after the war, and were scrapped during World War II as 16-inch guns and other weapons at other forts superseded them.

The two 10-inch guns on disappearing carriages currently mounted at Fort Casey were transferred from the Philippines in the 1960s, along with two three-inch guns. The 10-inch guns are M1895MI (No. 26 and No. 28 Watervliet) on disappearing carriages M1901 (No. 13 and No. 15 Watertown) at Battery Worth, Fort Casey (originally at Battery Warwick, Fort Wint, Grande Island, Philippines). The three-inch guns are M1903 (No. 11 and No. 12) on barbette carriages M1903 (No. 6 and No. 7) at Battery Trevor, Fort Casey (originally at Battery Flake, Fort Wint).

Park features
Fort Casey is a  marine camping park. The Admiralty Head Lighthouse is located within the state park. Three miles of the Pacific Northwest National Scenic Trail wrap around the park.

See also
 14th Coast Artillery (United States)

Notes

References

External links

 Fort Casey Historical State Park Washington State Parks and Recreation Commission
 Fort Casey Historical State Park Map Washington State Parks and Recreation Commission
 Fort Casey fortifications
 FortWiki article on Fort Casey

Casey
Ebey's Landing National Historical Reserve
State parks of Washington (state)
Parks in Island County, Washington
History of Island County, Washington
Casey
National Register of Historic Places in Island County, Washington
Protected areas established in 1955